Selden Allen McMeans (July 1806 – July 31, 1876) was an American physician and politician.

Born near Knoxville, Tennessee, McMeans first began practicing medicine in the 1840s in Greenville, South Carolina. In 1846, he volunteered for service in the Mexican–American War. After the war ended, he moved to El Dorado County, California, where he was a member of the California State Assembly for the 12th District (1852–54) and served as the second California State Treasurer (1854–56).

In the fall of 1859, McMeans moved to Virginia City, Nevada after the Comstock Lode silver strike. When the news of the firing on Fort Sumter reached Virginia City in 1861, McMeans announced that he would capture Fort Churchill for the Confederacy, but was quickly disabused of this notion by news of a detachment of Union soldiers heading from Fort Churchill to Virginia City. After the Civil War, he organized the Democratic Party in Nevada and became its first chairman. He eventually moved to Reno, where he died at age 70 in 1876.

External links 
 "Dr. Selden A. McMeans, Nevada's Early Politician Doctor", Greasewood Tablettes, University of Nevada Medical School, Spring 2004

1806 births
1876 deaths
American military personnel of the Mexican–American War
Physicians from South Carolina
Members of the California State Assembly
Nevada Democrats
People from El Dorado County, California
People from Knoxville, Tennessee
State political party chairs of Nevada
State treasurers of California
19th-century American politicians
People from Virginia City, Nevada
Politicians from Reno, Nevada